Birmingham City Football Club, an English association football club based in the city of Birmingham, was founded in 1875 as Small Heath Alliance. For their first thirteen years, there was no league football, so matches were arranged on an occasional basis, supplemented by cup competitions organised at both local and national level. In 1888, Small Heath joined the Combination, a league set up to provide organised football for those clubs not invited to join the Football League which was to start the same year. However, the Combination was not well organised, and folded in April 1889 with many fixtures still outstanding. Small Heath were founder members of the Football Alliance in 1889, and three years later were elected to the newly formed Second Division of the Football League. They topped the table in their first season, though failed to win promotion via the test match system then in operation, but reached the top flight for the first time in 1894. Since that time, they have not fallen below the third tier of the English football league system, and were promoted to the Premier League for the first time for the 2002–03 season.

Birmingham's first team have competed in a number of nationally contested leagues, and their record against each club faced in those competitions is summarised below. The opening match of the 1889–90 Football Alliance season pitted them against near neighbours Birmingham St George's, their first Football League match was against Burslem Port Vale, and they met their 109th and most recent different league opponent, Burton Albion, for the first time in the 2016–17 EFL Championship season. The team that Birmingham have played most in league competition is Manchester City, whom they first met as Ardwick in the 1891–92 Football Alliance season. Wolverhampton Wanderers have beaten Birmingham 62 times in the league, more than any other team: they overtook Manchester City's total of 60 victories in the 2017–18 EFL Championship season. Derby County have drawn 36 league encounters with Birmingham, one more than Everton and West Bromwich Albion. Birmingham have recorded more league victories against Leicester City than against any other club, having beaten them 50 times out of 124 attempts.

All statistics are correct up to and including the match played against Queens Park Rangers on 18 March 2023.

Key
The table includes results of matches played by Birmingham City (under that name and under former names Birmingham and Small Heath) in the Football Alliance, the Football League and the Premier League. Matches from uncompleted competitionsthe abandoned 1939–40 Football League season and the unfinished 1888–89 season in the Combinationare excluded, as are test matches, Football League play-offs, and matches in the various wartime competitions.
The name used for each opponent is the name they had when Birmingham City most recently played a league match against them. Results against each opponent include results against that club under any former name. For example, results against Leyton Orient include matches played against Orient (1966–1987) and Clapton Orient (before 1945).
The columns headed "First" and "Last" contain the first and most recent seasons in which Birmingham City played league matches against each opponent.
P = matches played; W = matches won; D = matches drawn; L = matches lost; Win% = percentage of total matches won
  Clubs with this background and symbol in the "Opponent" column are Birmingham City's divisional rivals in the current season, the 2022–23 EFL Championship.
  Clubs with this background and symbol in the "Opponent" column are defunct.

All-time league record

Notes

Sources

References

League record by opponent
English football club league records by opponent